Throughout its history and into the present, the United States has held political prisoners, people whose detention is based substantially on political motives. Prominent U.S. political prisoners have included anti-war socialists, civil rights movement activists, conscientious objectors, and War on Terrorism detainees.

"Political prisoner" is an inherently vague term which is most commonly applied to people persecuted for their political beliefs or for their "threat" to the government. Imprisonment for mere expression of political beliefs is rare in the United States, because free speech and free expression are well-established in law. However, several human rights groups, such as Amnesty International, have pointed to repeated examples of US federal and state governments targeting people affiliated with dissident movements for "neutralization" by applying much harsher sentences for real or "framed" crimes, such as during COINTELPRO.

History and scope 

There are no systematic estimates of the present or past scope of political prisoners in the United States. The number of political prisoners cannot be precisely determined. However, Jane Taubner wrote in 1992 that "most of the individuals and organizations investigating the existence of political prisoners in the United States agree that there are a minimum of over 100 political prisoners in America".

During a July 1978 interview with French newspaper Le Matin de Paris, Ambassador to the United Nations Andrew Young caused controversy when he said: "We still have hundreds of people that I would categorize as political prisoners in our prisons. Maybe even thousands, depending on how you categorize them."

In 1988, Peggy Halsey, a senior member of the United Methodist Church General Board of Global Ministries, wrote about inmates of the High Security Unit in FMC Lexington and claimed that "over 100 other inmates are recognized as political prisoners by their respective movements for social change".

In 1990, various left-wing groups supported the Freedom Now! coalition and organized a "Special International Tribunal" (or "1990 Tribunal") on political prisoners in the US. The 1990 tribunal was inspired by the 1951 We Charge Genocide petition and modeled on the 1966 Russell Tribunal on Vietnam. Freedom Now! alleged that there are "more than 100 people locked up in U.S. prisons because of their political actions or beliefs". The 1990 Tribunal reached the verdict that political people "have been subjected to disproportionately lengthy prison sentences and to torture, cruel, inhumane and degrading treatment within the U.S. prison system."

The U.S. has recognized conscientious objection to military service since its founding. However, the U.S. only recognizes blanket objection to all wars, and does not recognize stronger forms of the "right to refuse to kill", such as opposition to specific wars. Many prisoners have been objectors to specific wars (such as World War I, the Vietnam War, the Gulf War, or Iraq War).

Early notable alleged political prisoners 
The concepts of "political prisoner" and "prisoner of conscience" were underdeveloped until the post-World War II era, which saw the creation of intergovernmental and international human rights groups like the United Nations Commission on Human Rights (1946) and Amnesty International (1961). The prisoners below were arrested before or during this era:

 Alice Paul (imprisoned 1917), a feminist, was incarcerated for peacefully picketing for women's suffrage. Paul explicitly described herself as a political prisoner in efforts that led to the 19th Amendment. Other feminists arrested for picketing for women's suffrage led the 1919 Prison Special train tour.
 Eugene Debs (imprisoned 19191921), an anti-war socialist, was convicted of 10 counts of sedition. On September 18, 1918, he was sentenced to ten years in prison and life disenfranchisement. On April 13, 1919, Debs was imprisoned; protests of his imprisonment lead to the May Day riots of 1919. While in prison, he ran for president in the 1920 election, receiving 919,799 votes (3.4 percent) the highest number of votes for a Socialist Party presidential candidate in the United States.
 Sacco and Vanzetti (imprisoned 19211927), both anarchists, were convicted and executed for murdering two people during an armed robbery. Kathlyn Gay includes them in a list of "political prisoners" and quotes Massachusetts Governor Michael Dukakis as saying "their trial and appeals were permeated by prejudice against foreigners and hostility toward unorthodox political views".
 Angelo Herndon (imprisoned 19331937), an African-American labor organizer and member of the American Communist Party, was convicted of insurrection after leading a large peaceful demonstration of unemployed black and white workers in Atlanta. The day after the demonstration, Angelo was arrested and was found in possession of communist publications. Fulton County Prosecutor John Hudson charged Angelo with "inciting an insurrection" under an 1861 slave statue that made the possession or distribution of seditious literature punishable by death. Hudson proclaimed that Herndon's trial was also a trial "of Lenin, Stalin, Trotsky and Kerensky, and every white person who believes that black and white should unite for the purpose of setting-up a Nigger Soviet Republic in the Black Belt". An all white jury found Angelo guilty and was sentenced to 1820 years. Angelo won an appeal and was released on bail in December 1934. The Georgia Supreme Court later upheld the original conviction and he had to return to prison in October 1935. In April 1937, the U.S. Supreme Court heard the case and ruled in favor of Angelo in a 54 decision, striking down the Georgia insurrection for violation of the First Amendment.
 Julius and Ethel Rosenberg (imprisoned 19511953), spies for the Soviet Union, were the first Americans to be executed for espionage. Gay includes them in a list of political prisoners, in part because of their excessive sentence: "No other convicted spy  not even Rudolph Abel, the Soviet Union's chief spymaster in the United States  was executed by the United States during the entire Cold War".

 Martin Luther King Jr., an anti-racist organizer, was never imprisoned for an extended period of time, but he was arrested 29 times between 1956 and 1964. He is often named as a prisoner of conscience for his nonviolent opposition to racial segregation in the United States.
 Rosa Parks (arrested 1956), an anti-racist organizer, is commonly named as a prisoner of conscience for her civil disobedience to Montgomery bus segregation. In the 1970s, Parks organized for the freedom of political prisoners in the United States, particularly cases involving issues of self-defense. She helped found the Detroit chapter of the Joanne Little Defense Committee, supported other prisoner's defense committees, and supported the Wilmington Ten, RNA 11, and Gary Tyler. When Angela Davis was acquitted, Parks introduced her to an audience of 12,000 as a "dear sister who has suffered so much persecution".

Prisoners highlighted by Amnesty International 

Amnesty International is an INGO founded to oppose violations of human rights. Amnesty International has named the following people and groups as prisoners of conscience or political prisoners in the United States:

 Martin Sostre (imprisoned 19671976) was arrested at his bookstore for "narcotics, riot, arson, and assault", later proven to be fabricated as part of COINTELPRO. Amnesty International wrote that Sostre "was falsely implicated because of his political activities". Sostre's bookstore promoted Black nationalism, internationalism, and anarchism.
 Imari Obadele (imprisoned 19731978), as part of the RNA 11, was convicted of conspiracy to assault a federal agent. Amnesty International wrote that it "appears that the real reason for Mr Obadele's imprisonment is his political activity as leader of a black independence movement".
 The Wilmington Ten (imprisoned 19761980) were convicted of arson and conspiracy for the firebombing of a white-owned business. Amnesty International adopted the Ten because they were "denied a fair trial", because "their prosecutions were politically motivated and that their convictions were the result of false testimony".
 Charlotte Three (imprisoned 19771979) were convicted of arson of a white-owned business. Amnesty International adopted the Three for the same reasons as the Wilmington Ten.
 U.S. military conscientious objectors to the Gulf War: By September 1991, Amnesty International had adopted 25 prisoners of conscience who conscientiously objected to the Gulf War. In their 1995 report, Amnesty gave the full number as 30 prisoners of conscience. In particular, Amnesty International named George Morse (imprisoned 19911992) and Yolanda Huet-Vaughn (imprisoned 19911992).

Amnesty International has identified multiple American conscientious objectors to the Iraq War who have either been imprisoned or are seeking refuge, notably in Canada, for their resistance. These individuals include:

 Camilo Mejía (imprisoned 20042005) 
 Abdullah William Webster (imprisoned 20042005) 
 Kevin Benderman (imprisoned 20052006) 
 Mark Wilkerson (imprisoned 2007) 
 Agustin Aguayo (imprisoned 2007) 
 Victor Agosto (imprisoned 2009) 
 Travis Bishop (imprisoned 2009) 
 Kimberly Rivera (imprisoned 20122013)
Jeremy Hinzman (seeking refuge in Canada) 
Matthew Lowell (seeking refuge in Canada) 
James Corey Glass (seeking refuge in Canada)
Dean Walcott (seeking refuge in Canada)
Ehren Watada (OTH discharged)

Amnesty International has highlighted the following people and groups as recipients of extensive inhumane treatment and/or wrongful or "framed" convictions, who may be considered political prisoners:

 Geronimo Ji-Jaga Pratt (imprisoned 19721997), a prominent member of the Black Panther Party, was convicted of murder (now vacated). In 1995, Amnesty International argued that evidence came to light after the trial that "Pratt had been targeted for 'neutralization' by COINTELPRO and suggested there had been misconduct by the FBI and state police in the prosecution of the case". 
 The Angola Three were convicted of robbery and/or bank robbery, sent to Angola prison. While in prison, the Angola Three became prominent Black Panther Party members. They were later convicted of prison murders and faced near-continuous solitary confinement for decades, in the "longest period of solitary confinement in American prison history". 
 Mumia Abu-Jamal (imprisoned 1981present): Though Amnesty International concluded that his conviction proceedings violated the "minimum international standards that govern fair trial procedures and the use of the death penalty", but they did not describe Abu-Jamal as a political prisoner. In August 1999, when Abu-Jamal began giving radio commentary live on Pacifica Network's Democracy Now! radio news, prison staff severed the connecting wires of his telephone in mid-performance. The World Socialist Web Site described Abu-Jamal as a "political prisoner".
 Gary Tyler (imprisoned 19752016) was convicted of first-degree murder as a sixteen-year old, despite no physical evidence. In 1994, Amnesty International highlighted several major inconsistencies in the police investigation and ineffective assistance of counsel. In 2007, Amnesty International said Tyler's trial was "fundamentally unfair".
 Food Not Bombs: Amnesty International never formally named Keith McHenry or Robert Kahn as prisoners of conscience. However, in 1994, AI noted that "the law may have been used to harass and arrest these individuals because their activities" of "distributing free food to poor and homeless people and disseminating literature" are "unpopular with the City administration". In 1996, AI suggested that Kahn "may be a prisoner of conscience".
 Mazen Al-Najjar (imprisoned 19972000), on the basis of secret evidence, was detained indefinitely on suspicions of links to Palestinian terrorist groups. If Al-Najjar was "being held purely for his non-violent political sympathies and background, then he would be considered a prisoner of conscience".
 Stop Cop City: In March 2023, Amnesty International co-signed a letter which said that "application of the domestic terrorism statute" against 19 of the 35 arrested March 2023 protestors "is an escalatory intimidation tactic and a draconian step that seems intended to chill First Amendment protected activity".

Prisoners considered by the Working Group on Arbitrary Detention 
The Working Group on Arbitrary Detention (WAGD) is a United Nations body which examines alleged cases of arbitrary imprisonment. Arbitrary imprisonment is substantially broader than political imprisonment, as it also includes all cases where non-arbitrary legal processes failed for non-political reasons. The WAGD has considered the detention of the following individuals to be arbitrary on multiple categories:

 Leonard Peltier (imprisoned 1977present) was convicted on two counts of murder of FBI agents during a shootout on Pine Ridge Indian Reservation. Amnesty International explicitly does not call Peltier a prisoner of conscience, but "believes that political factors may have influenced the way in which the case was prosecuted". In 2005, the WAGD found that the "deprivation of Mr. Leonard Peltier is not arbitrary", but in 2022 reversed that decision and found that Peltier's imprisonment was arbitrary on Category III (unfair trial) and Category V (discrimination) grounds. Peltier was a prominent member of the American Indian Movement.
 Marcos Antonio Aguilar-Rodríguez (imprisoned 20112017) fled El Salvador to the United States in 2001, where he sought asylum. He was arrested for speeding, but was ultimately placed in custody of ICE, who sought to deport him. The WAGD found that Aguilar-Rodríguez's imprisonment was arbitrary on Category II (human rights), Category IV (prolonged custody of migrants), and Category V (discrimination).
 Fernando Aguirre-Urbina (imprisoned 20122019) was brought to the United States as an undocumented minor at age 3. He pled guilty to intent to distribute meth and marijuana, served 8 months, and was released to ICE detention for 7 years. The WAGD found that Aguirre-Urbina's detention was arbitrary under all five categories.

 Steven Donziger (imprisoned 20192022): Donziger, who had pursued a series of legal cases against Chevron Corporation, was placed under house arrest for contempt of court. The WAGD found that Donziger's house arrest was arbitrary on Category I (no legal basis), Category III (unfair trial), and Category V (discrimination).
 The Cuban Five (imprisoned 20012014) were convicted of espionage on Cuban-American groups for the government of Cuba. The WAGD found that their imprisonment was arbitrary on Category III (unfair trial), due to extended solitary confinement (17 months), limited access to evidence (under CIPA), and biased jury selection (anti-Cuban-government sentiment in Miami).
 Benamar Benatta (imprisoned 20012006) is a refugee from Algeria whose status was revoked soon after the September 11 attacks. Despite having been cleared of suspicions of terrorist activities by the FBI, Benatta was held in detention for nearly five years. The WAGD said that Benatta's treatment "could be described as torture" and found that his detention was abitrary on Category I (no legal basis) and Category III (unfair trial).
 Humberto Álvarez Machaín (imprisoned 19901992) was accused of participating in the drug cartel-linked torture of Kiki Camarena and abducted to the United States. Alvarez Machaín was acquitted in 1992. The WAGD found that Alvarez Machaín's imprisonment was arbitrary on Category I (no legal basis). Álvarez Machaín's abduction eventually led to the 1992 Supreme Court decision United States v. Alvarez-Machain.

Later notable alleged political prisoners 
Because the term "political prisoner" is vague, there is disagreement on who should be included by that term. The people below prominently described themselves (or were described by other prominent people) as political prisoners:
 Fred Hampton (imprisoned 1969), a local chairman of the Black Panther Party, was convicted of assaulting an Good Humor ice cream van driver, stealing $71 worth of ice cream bars, and giving them to kids on the street. In a memoir, Frank B. Wilderson III places this incident in the context of COINTELPRO efforts to disrupt the Black Panthers of Chicago by the "leveling of trumped-up charges". In 1969, Hampton was killed in his sleep by Cook County police officers. Civil rights activists Roy Wilkins and Ramsey Clark, styled as "The Commission of Inquiry into the Black Panthers and the Police", alleged that the Chicago police had killed Hampton without justification or provocation and had violated the Panthers' constitutional rights against unreasonable search and seizure. "The Commission" further alleged that the Chicago Police Department had imposed a summary punishment on the Panthers.
 Richard Wershe Jr. (imprisoned 19872021) was an FBI informant who was convicted of possession of over 650 grams of cocaine. The film White Boy describes Wershe as a "political prisoner" who received harsh sentences for informing on several Detroit representatives.
 Lyndon LaRouche (imprisoned 19881994): LaRouche was convicted of conspiracy to commit mail fraud. LaRouche's attorney called the conviction politically motivated, while the judge in question said the idea that LaRouche's organization was a sufficient threat to warrant this "just defies human experience." The LaRouche movement, which mixes far-left and far-right rhetoric, and which the The New York Times calls "cult-like", has claimed that LaRouche is a political prisoner and appealed to the United Nations Commission on Human Rights for relief; the WAGD did not consider his case.

 Chelsea Manning (imprisoned 20102017) was described as a prisoner of conscience by The Canary, which accused Amnesty International of pro-US bias for excluding Manning.
 Paul Manafort (imprisoned 20192020) describes himself as a "political prisoner" for his conviction in the Mueller special counsel investigation.
 People sentenced to prison for alleged involvement with the January 6 United States Capitol attack have been called political prisoners by InfoWars and Tucker Carlson, as well as several Republican members of Congress. Citing poor conditions, 34 prisoners published a letter that requested a transfer to Guantanamo Bay in which 7 signers called themselves "political prisoners".

See also 
 MKUltra, COINTELPRO, and the Church Committee
 Political abuse of psychiatry, including 5150 (involuntary psychiatric hold)
 Communications Management Unit (CMU)
 Prison abolition movement and Anarchist Black Cross
 Rasul v. Bush and the Center for Constitutional Rights
 National Lawyers Guild
 International Labor Defense and National Committee for the Defense of Political Prisoners
 Partisan Defense Committee
 Prison Radio
 Attica Prison riot
 Prisoners' rights

Endnotes

References

External links 
 Publications tagged as "prisoners of conscience" and "United States" by Amnesty International
 Opinions adopted by the Working Group on Arbitrary Detention
 Search for documents from the United Nations OHCHR
 Political Prisoners collection in The Freedom Archives
 Political Prisoners by Location by Anarchist Black Cross

Human rights in the United States
Imprisonment and detention
 
 
Political repression in the United States
Penal system in the United States